Calothamnus quadrifidus, commonly known as one-sided bottlebrush, is a plant in the myrtle family, Myrtaceae and is endemic to the south-west of Western Australia. The common name alludes to the arrangement of the flowers in the inflorescence which line up on one side of the stem. It is a shrub with grey-green, pine-like foliage covered with soft hairs and red, four-part flowers in spring. Widely cultivated because of its attractive foliage, colourful, unusual and prolific flowers, it grows in a variety of habitats and soils. In 2010, Alex George published a review of the species based on recent research and described a number of new subspecies. (In 2014 Craven, Edwards and Cowley proposed that the species be renamed Melaleuca quadrifida.)

Description
Calothamnus quadrifidus is a shrub which sometimes grows to a height of  although usually much less and it sometimes has a lignotuber.

The flowers are usually red, although there are white and yellow forms, with the red flowered form most commonly seen in cultivation. The flowers are arranged in clusters, usually on one side of the stem amongst the older leaves. The stamens are arranged in 4 claw-like bundles, all about the same length. In most subspecies, flowering occurs in spring.

Taxonomy and naming
Calothamnus quadrifidus was first formally described in 1812 by Robert Brown from a specimen he collected at Lucky Bay near Esperance during the Investigator expedition with Matthew Flinders. The description was published in Curtis's Botanical Magazine (edited by John Sims).

The subspecies described by Alex George and recognised by the Western Australian Herbarium are:

 Calothamnus quadrifidus subsp. asper  (Turcz.)
 Calothamnus quadrifidus subsp. homalophyllus  (F.Muell.)
 Calothamnus quadrifidus subsp. obtusus  (Benth.)
 Calothamnus quadrifidus  R.Br  subsp. quadrifidus has cylindrical, usually hairy leaves and a hairy hypanthium;
 Calothamnus quadrifidus subsp. teretifolius A.S.George & N.Gibson  has cylindrical, glabrous leaves and a glabrous hypanthium;

Distribution and habitat
Calothamnus quadrifidus is common and widespread in the Eremaean and South-West botanical provinces, occurring in a wide range of habitats and growing in a range of soils.

Ecology
Research on the competition between honeybees (Apis mellifera) and honeyeaters (especially the Brown honeyeater and White-cheeked honeyeater) for the nectar of Calothamnus quadrifidus has shown that honeyeaters consume more nectar early in the day. Honeybees, because of their much greater numbers consume a larger volume of nectar but nevertheless, honeyeaters were the more important in pollen dispersal.

Conservation status
Calothamnus quadrifidus is classified as "not threatened" by the Western Australian Government Department of Parks and Wildlife but subspecies asper is listed as "Priority Two" meaning that it is poorly known and from only one or a few locations. Suspecies teretifolius is listed as  "Priority Four" by the Government of Western Australia Department of Parks and Wildlife, meaning that is rare or near threatened.

Uses

Horticulture
Calothamnus quadrifidus is probably the best known of the genus in cultivation. It has attractive foliage, colourful flowers over a long period, is frost hardy and drought tolerant when well established. It is attractive to honeyeating birds and although it can become woody with age, it responds well to pruning.

Phytotherapeutic studies
This species has been used in phytotherapeutic studies and its aerial parts have been found to contain phenolic acids and flavonoids.

Gallery

References

quadrifidus
Endemic flora of Western Australia
Myrtales of Australia
Plants described in 1812
Taxa named by Robert Brown (botanist, born 1773)
Garden plants of Australia